The 2021–22 South Dakota Coyotes men's basketball team represented the University of South Dakota in the 2021–22 NCAA Division I men's basketball season. The Coyotes, led by fourth-year head coach Todd Lee, played their home games at the Sanford Coyote Sports Center in Vermillion, South Dakota as members of the Summit League. They finished the season 19–12, 11–7 in Summit League play to finish in fifth place. They defeated Kansas City in the quarterfinals of the Summit League tournament before losing to South Dakota State in the semifinals. 

On March 10, 2022, the school fired head coach Todd Lee after four years. On March 15, the school named Utah State assistant Eric Peterson the team's new head coach.

Previous season
In a season limited due to the ongoing COVID-19 pandemic, the Coyotes finished the 2020–21 season 14–11, 11–4 in Summit League play to finish in second place. As the No. 2 seed in the Summit League tournament, they defeated Western Illinois in the quarterfinals, before falling to North Dakota State in the semifinals.

Roster

Schedule and results

|-
!colspan=12 style=| Exhibition

|-
!colspan=12 style=| Non-conference regular season

|-
!colspan=12 style=| Summit League regular season

|-
!colspan=9 style=|Summit League tournament

Sources

References

South Dakota Coyotes men's basketball seasons
South Dakota
Coyo
Coyo